Gyem Dorji is a Bhutanese politician who has been a member of the National Assembly of Bhutan, since October 2018.

Education
He holds a Master of Science in Environmental Engineering degree from Asian Institute of Technology, Thailand.

Political career
Before joining politics, he was an Environmentalist and a Forester.

He unsuccessfully ran for Trongsa District in the 2018 Bhutanese National Council election. He came in third receiving 1,344 votes and losing the seat to Tashi Samdrup.

He was elected to the National Assembly of Bhutan as a candidate of DNT from Draagteng-Langthil constituency in 2018 Bhutanese National Assembly election. He received 1,979 votes and defeated Ugyen Namgyel, a candidate of DPT.

References 

1977 births
Living people
Bhutanese MNAs 2018–2023
Druk Nyamrup Tshogpa politicians
Asian Institute of Technology alumni
Bhutanese environmentalists
Druk Nyamrup Tshogpa MNAs